Central United Methodist Church is a historic church in Mansfield, Ohio. It was built in 1910 and added to the National Register of Historic Places in 1983.

References

United Methodist churches in Ohio
Churches on the National Register of Historic Places in Ohio
Romanesque Revival church buildings in Ohio
Churches completed in 1910
Churches in Richland County, Ohio
National Register of Historic Places in Richland County, Ohio
Churches in Mansfield, Ohio